The Changsha–Ganzhou high-speed railway is a planned high-speed railway in China.

It will be part of the Xiamen–Chongqing corridor.

Stations

References 

High-speed railway lines in China
High-speed railway lines under construction